Dina Perbellini (14 January, 1901 – 2 April, 1984) was an Italian actress. She appeared in over sixty films and television series between 1934 and 1969 and was also a leading voice actress, dubbing foreign films for release in Italy.

Career
Born in Vicenza, Perbellini made her acting debut at 20, as a member of the Gualtiero Tumiati's stage company. She later worked in numerous companies including those led by Aldo Silvani, Emma Gramatica and Antonio Gandusio, before starting her own company together with collegues  and Miranda Campa in 1930. She made her film debut in the 1934 school comedy Seconda B, credited as Dirce Bellini. After appearing in numerous other films, she eventually decided to use her real name starting from the late 1930s. Starting from 1950s she was also active as an acting teacher, and between 1962 and 1968 she taught at the Centro Sperimentale di Cinematografia in Rome. She was also very active as a radio actress and as a dubber.

Partial filmography

 Seconda B (1934) - Professorina Vanni
 Three Cornered Hat (1935) - Donna Dolores, moglie del governatore
 Le scarpe al sole (1935) - La moglie di Bepo
 Ginevra degli Almieri (1936)
 Amore (1936) - Luisa
 The Castiglioni Brothers (1937) - Berta
 It Was I! (1937) - Signora in villeggiatura
 The Last Days of Pompeo (1937)
 Il conte di Brechard (1938)
 La sposa dei re (1938) - La signora Clary
 Crispino e la comare (1938) - La comare
 The Marquis of Ruvolito (1939) - La contessa Scoperlati
 Il barone di Corbò (1939) - Didone
 Mad Animals (1939) - La direttrice dell'ospedale degli animali
 Il ladro sono io (1940) - Giulia
 Alessandro sei grande! (1940) - Olga Dell'Incanto
 The Sinner (1940) - Ortensia (uncredited)
 Captain Fracasse (1940) - La marchesa Di Bruyeres
 Pensaci Giacomino (1940) - (uncredited)
 The Happy Ghost (1941) - Zia Giovanna
 La compagnia della teppa (1941) - La signora Mellario
 The Iron Crown (1941) - La nutrice (uncredited)
 Pia de' Tolomei (1941) - Tonia, la guardiana
 Yes, Madam (1942) - Signora Bracco-Rinaldi
 Short Circuit (1943) - La contessa
 Gioco d'azzardo (1943)
 The Children Are Watching Us (1944) - Zia Berelli
 Chi l'ha visto? (1945)
 What a Distinguished Family (1945) - Olga
 My Beautiful Daughter (1950) - Mrs. Favarelli
 Hearts at Sea (1950) - Madre di Leone
 Appointment for Murder (1951) - Signora Rosini
 Anna (1951) - Una malata
 Porca miseria (1951) - The Pension Owner (uncredited)
 Vacation with a Gangster (1952)
 The Overcoat (1952)
 In Olden Days (1952) - Madre della sposa (segment "Pot-pourri di canzoni")
 I figli non si vendono (1952)
 Who is Without Sin (1952) - La madre superiora (uncredited)
 Perdonami! (1953) - (uncredited)
 I Chose Love (1953)
 Vortice (1953) - Suora infermiera
 Naples Sings (1953) - The Mother Superior
 Angels of Darkness (1954) - Woman with a Carnation in her Hands (uncredited)
 Schiava del peccato (1954) - La signora Cesira
 Camilla (1954)
 I cinque dell'Adamello (1954) - Madre di Piero
 Friends for Life (1955) - (uncredited)
 Giuramento d'amore (1955) - Clara's Aunt
 Io piaccio (1955)
 Altair (1956)
 Incatenata dal destino (1956)
 Tempo di villeggiatura (1956) - Silvana's Mother
 Il prezzo della gloria (1956) - zia Dora
 Saranno uomini (1957)
 Husbands in the City (1957) - La cognata (uncredited)
 Un amore senza fine (1958)
 La cambiale (1959) - The Marquise at the pet shop
 Il principe fusto (1960) - Madre di Susan
 Le bal des espions (1960)
 Madri pericolose (1960) - Countess Federica Ornano1960
 Totò, Peppino e... la dolce vita (1961) - Luisa Giovanna
 Se necesita chico (1963) - Doña Petra
 Il cavaliere inesistente'' (1969) - (final film role)

References

External links

1901 births
1984 deaths
Italian television actresses
Italian film actresses
Italian stage actresses
Italian voice actresses
People from Vicenza
20th-century Italian actresses
Academic staff of the Centro Sperimentale di Cinematografia